Grip strength is the force applied by the hand to pull on or suspend from objects and is a specific part of hand strength. Optimum-sized objects permit the hand to wrap around a cylindrical shape with a diameter from one to three inches. Stair rails are an example of where shape and diameter are critical for proper grip in case of a fall. Other grip strengths that have been studied are the hammer and other hand tools. In applications of grip strength, the wrist must be in a neutral position to avoid developing cumulative trauma disorders (CTDs).

Grip strength is a general term also used to refer to the physical strength of an animal and, for athletes, to the muscular power and force that can be generated with the hands. In athletics, grip strength is critical for rock climbers and is an important factor in strongman competitions and weight lifting.  Grip strength training is also a major feature in martial arts and can be useful in various professions where people must work with their hands.

Types of grip

The human hand can be used to grip objects in several different positions. These different positions require different types of grip strength which are typically quantified based on the way the hand is being used.

The crush grip is what is most commonly thought of as "grip".  It involves a handshake-type grip, where the object being gripped rests firmly against the palm and all fingers.  A strong crush grip is useful in bone-crushing handshakes or for breaking objects with pressure.

In a pinch grip, the fingers are on one side of an object, and the thumb is on the other.  Typically, an object lifted in a pinch grip does not touch the palm.  This is generally considered a weaker grip position.  The pinch grip is used when grabbing something like a weight plate or lifting a sheet of plywood by the top edge.

A support grip typically involves holding something, such as the handle of a bucket, for a long time.  This type of strength is epitomized by the Farmer's walk competitive event, where the bucket is filled with sand or water, and carried over a long distance.  A great deal of muscular endurance is necessary to have a good carrying grip.

Normative data
There has been extensive medical and ergonomic research looking at grip strength, which has found that 95% of men have a grip strength greater than 90% of women. Averages also exist for different types of grip in different positions.
Grip strength increases or decreases depending on the arm position at which the grip strength is being measured. A person's grip strength usually results in having the strongest grip strength when their arm is extended at 90° before their body, as opposed to the other extreme arm positions, rested at one's side or held straight up above one's head. Grip strength is not optimal if one's arm is extended backwards beyond the resting position at the body's sides.
It can be concluded that grip strength is affected via the different arm muscles and their ability to contract.

In medicine
Grip strength is often used in medicine as a specific type of hand strength. The purpose of this testing is diverse, including to diagnose diseases, to evaluate and compare treatments, to document progression of muscle strength, and to provide feedback during the rehabilitation process as a measure indicating the level of hand function. For example, it is used to indicate changes in hand strength after hand surgery or after a rehabilitation program. By asking subjects to maintain a maximum contraction for longer periods, it can be used as a measure of fatigue. It is also able to predict a decline in function in old age. The World Health Organization has identified Grip Strength as an indicator of vitality for aging populations. Since the above-mentioned grips involve the action of a large number of different joints and muscle groups, grip strength is not always very sensitive to measure individual muscle groups in medicine. For this purpose, dynamometers have been developed that provide more specific information on individual muscles in the hand such as the Rotterdam Intrinsic Hand Myometer (RIHM). In medicine, doctors sometimes use grip strength to test a patient's mentality, as grip strength directly correlates to mental state. Grip strength is also used to measure the degree of rehabilitation from injuries; all other things being equal, it will vary with general condition. Additionally, grip strength can be used to determine a patient's physical stability. Measuring this in intervals allows a doctor to determine if a patient is making progress or if different methods need to be used. There is a direct correlation between grip strength of older people and their overall body strength. This correlation helps doctors with treating the elderly a lot, because it allows doctors to see how well an elderly person is functioning. 
Relative handgrip strength, handgrip measure divided by body mass index (BMI), affects the future onset of diabetes and prediabetes.
A stronger handgrip is linked with less diabetes cases.
Strengthening the grip strength helps players recover from sport injuries such as tennis elbow.

In sports
Hand grip is an important, though often overlooked, component of strength in sports. However, the grip strength is most often a secondary or auxiliary function of the sport. Sports in which grip strength are included within the secondary focus include the following: movement-based climbing, calisthenics, gymnastics, pole dancing, horse racing, powerlifting or professional arm-wrestling; ball-based baseball, gridiron football, rugby, canoe polo, badminton or tennis; and combat sports such as wrestling, judo, brazilian jiu-jitsu, boxing or fencing. In sports, hand grip strength is a major factor in a player's strength, determining how easily a ball can be caught or how effectively equipment can be used. Hand grip strength is directly linked to hand-eye coordination: when a person is looking at the thing they are gripping, hand grip strength intensifies because of this synchronization.

Hand grip strength is very important when it comes to sports. Before a player begins playing a hand grip strength test is important for determining a player's workout.  Hand grip strength determines a player's readiness for sports. In golf, hand grip strength is used to control the power a golfer hits a golf ball. The angle at which a golfer hits the ball determines how far the ball goes. ... In football, the quarterback uses hand grip strength to throw accurate passers to receivers. The receivers use hand grip strength to catch and maintain control of the football. ... In hockey, hand grip strength is used to angle the shot of the puck, whether they are passing the puck or shooting for a goal. Hand grip strength is essential for the execution of skills in hockey. In martial arts, hand grip strength is a key use in mastering techniques. [2] Hand grip strength determines the success of arm functionality, such as speed and precision.

As a separate discipline
From their beginnings as odd performances at fairs and circuses, grip feats have recently gained acceptance as a sport in their own right, with competitions being held with increasing regularity. Events include one-arm deadlift, nail bending, the closing of torsion spring hand grippers, v-bar (vertical bar) lifting, and standardized pinch apparatuses. Other common events may include Rolling Thunder lifts, thickbar deadlifts, and "Blob" lifting.

The major contests are:
The King Kong Grip Challenge
North American Gripsport Championship
World's Strongest Hands
A Gripmas Carol
Champion of Champions
European Grip Championships
Mighty Mitts
Britain's Strongest Hands
British Grip Championships
Münsterland Grip Challenge
Global Grip Challenge
Loddekopinge Grip Challenge
Australian Grip Championships
German Grip Championships
Backyard Bastard Bash
Metroflex Mayhem at Metroflex
The National Capital Grip Championship
The South Jersey Grip Contest
The Southern Squeeze
Top 3 results back to 1955

Feats of strength
Although grip strength lends itself to impromptu performances that might feature a unique implement or cater to a particular individual or a small group, performances on standardized, widely available tests carry more weight.  One such feat involving world class grip strength is officially closing a No. 3 Captains of Crush Gripper, first accomplished by Richard Sorin in 1991.  Card tearing is a traditional feat of grip and lower arm strength that has a rich history, and top performances include John Brookfield tearing three decks of cards at once and tearing 50 decks of cards in less than a minute.  Brookfield has explained the technique for tearing cards in both his MILO article on the topic, and in his book The Grip Master's Manual Below are some of the most well known measures of grip strength.

Captains of Crush Grippers
Rolling Thunder
Apollon's Axle deadlift
Little Big Horn
Plate pinching
Block, Blob, Hub

Training methods

Grip strength training requires a different type of training regimen than other muscular training.  The reasons are primarily based on the interplay of the tendons and muscles and the lack of "down time" or rest that most people's hands get.

It is generally considered that all aspects of the hand must be exercised to produce a healthy and strong hand.  Only working on closing grip will cause an imbalance between closing and opening (antagonist) muscles, and can lead to problems such as tendinitis and carpal tunnel syndrome.

For closing grip
Thick bar and Thick Grip work on a two-inch or thicker bar—such as deadlifts, pullups, and the farmers walk—trains the support grip.
Grippers train the crushing grip.
Plate pinches grabbing plates smooth side out and pinching them.
Sledgehammer lever — levering a sledgehammer using the wrists to train fingers and wrists.
Plate curls/wrist curls — grabbing a plate and doing wrist curls or regular curls with them with the fingers on the bottom and thumb on top, trains the wrists and fingers and thumb for pinch grip.
Blockweights — cut off ends of hex dumbbells that are grasped in a pinch grip fashion from different sides of the blockweight with one end grasped by fingers and other by thumb; trained with either singles, timed holds, or tosses from hand to hand.
Hangboard can be used for training the full-crimp grip, half-crimp grip and open hand grip, required in climbing.

For opening grip
Extensors; these are the muscles that oppose the flexors of the hands and should be trained to achieve a good balance between opposing muscle groups; extensor muscles are key in grip because they must contract aggressively to support finger flexion. Shoving your hand in something like rice and extending it, or placing something such as rocks in a coffee can, putting your hand in there, and extending it to pick up the coffee can, are ways of training your hand extensors.
Some grip companies, such as IronMind Enterprises Inc., sell high-resistance rubber bands which work the extensor grip. Another option, is a weight based machine like "The Gripper" offered by Fitness Specialties U.S.A.. This type of plate loaded machine will not only strengthen your grip but also your forearm strength. 
As finger flexor/extensors serve a function as wrist flexor/extensors, doing wrist extension exercises (sometimes called "reverse wrist curls") would also stimulate the finger extensor fibers.
Doing fist pushups on the backside of the first fingerbone would increasingly put pressure on the extensor muscles as weight was shifted from knuckle-end to the further joint. When in a tight fist, the flat of the fingernails can dig into the palm and push the skin down to create a bridge to stabilize the first structure and prevent hyperflexion of the knuckle joints (which can be observed by doing pushups with the entire backside of the fingers flat on the ground, fingers pointing towards the opposite hand).

For stabilization
Fingertip pushups would utilize both opening and closing grip muscles to keep the finger from sliding, as well as more focused bone density in the hand, though they are very strenuous and dangerous unless approached progressively.
Hand stands free from a wall with fingers pointing behind would use gripping stretching to stabilize the hand to prevent the body from falling towards the front, and extensor muscles to prevent the body from falling towards the back.
Metal-rod exercises strengthen the grip indirectly but very effectively through strength training using a metal rod or pole.

Notable grip strength athletes
  Joe Kinney - First man to close the No. 4 Captains of Crush Gripper
  Nathan Holle - Second man to close the No. 4 Captains of Crush Gripper 
  David Morton - Third man to close the No. 4 Captains of Crush Gripper 
  Tommy Heslep - Fourth man to close the No. 4 Captains of Crush Gripper
  Magnus Samuelsson (strongman & arm wrestler) - Last man to close the No. 4 Captains of Crush Gripper and the only man to rep it.
  Louis 'Apollon' Uni (Traditional strongman)
  Thomas Inch (traditional strongman)
  Hermann Görner (traditional strongman)
  Joe 'Mighty Atom' Greenstein (traditional strongman)
  Dennis Rogers (strongman & arm wrestler)
  Odd Haugen (strongman)
  Laine Snook (strongman)
  Andrus Murumets (strongman)
  Manfred Hoeberl (strongman)
  Jesse Marunde (strongman)
  Mike Burke (strongman)
  Mark Felix (strongman)
  Andy Bolton (strongman & powerlifter)
  Benedikt Magnússon (strongman & powerlifter)
  Brian Shaw (strongman)
  Hafþór Júlíus Björnsson (strongman)
  Martins Licis (strongman)
  Kirill Sarychev (powerlifter)
  Denis Cyplenkov (arm wrestler)
  Levan Saginashvili (arm wrestler)
  Alexey Tyukalov (grip strength specialist)
  Harri Tolonen (grip strength specialist)
  Jouni Mähönen (grip strength specialist)
  Igor Kupinsky (grip strength specialist)
  John McCarter (grip strength specialist)
  Andrew Durniat (grip strength specialist)
  Rich Williams (grip strength specialist)
  Larry 'Wheels' Williams (multi disciplinary athlete)
  Richard Sorin (grip strength specialist and strength historian)
  David Horne (grip strength specialist and strength historian)

See also
List of basic exercise topics

Notes

References

Climbing and health
Weight training
Articles containing video clips
Exercise physiology